Tayway is a bus (and previously rail) service between Dundee and Arbroath in Scotland. The service started in November 1980 and was operated jointly by Tayside Regional Council, Northern Scottish and British Rail. It included an integrated timetable and fare system, meaning that tickets could be used on all three operators. The brand is now used for Stagecoach Strathtay's route 73.

Original service 
A partnership was formed in 1980 between Tayside Regional Council, Northern Scottish and British Rail whereby fares would be standardised and details of all services would be published in a shared timetable. The buses and trains operating on the route were given Tayway branding, including British Rail's fleet of 5 s and Tayside Regional Council's fleet of 26 Daimler Fleetlines. The arrangement came to an end in 1986 due to bus deregulation in the United Kingdom and the bus services were taken over by Strathtay Scottish, who used a fleet of AEC Routemasters on the route.

Current use 
Strathtay Scottish were bought by Stagecoach Group in 2005, who continued to use the Tayway brand for their route 73 between Ninewells Hospital, Dundee, Broughty Ferry, Monifieth, Carnoustie, and Arbroath. The 73 service runs every 10 minutes on weekdays, every 15 minutes on Saturdays, and every 30 minutes on Sundays. 

The route was notable for being the only bus route in the UK (outside of London) to retain bus conductors, known locally as clippies. Conductors were found on most bus services in the area until the 1980s, when most buses became pay-on-entry, minimising the need for a second staff member on board. Conductors speed up journey times, minimising dwell time at bus stops en-route as the driver does not need to issue fares. However, conductor-operation on the route was stopped in March 2020 as a result of the Coronavirus pandemic, and it was later announced that conductors would not return to the route.

In November 2014, Stagecoach announced a three-month trial of two New Routemaster buses. The trial was unsuccessful, with buses frequently breaking down, causing substantial delays.

The route is now operated with 18 hybrid double-decker buses built by Alexander Dennis in Falkirk and Volvo in Sweden.

References 

Transport in Dundee
Transport in Angus, Scotland
Bus routes in Scotland
British Rail brands
Tayside
Stagecoach Group